Catherine/Katherine Stuart or Stewart may refer to:

Catherine of Braganza, wife of Charles II of Great Britain
Catherine Stewart, character in Chloe (film)
Katie Stuart, full name Katherine Stuart, Canadian actress
Catherine Stewart (1881-1957), New Zealand politician 
Katherine Stewart (journalist)

See also
Catrin Stewart, Welsh actress